Arshak Karapetyan (born 6 February 1967) is an Armenian major general who served as Minister of Defense of Armenia from 3 August to 15 November 2021.

Biography 
Arshak Karapetyan was born on 6 February 1967 in Yerevan. From 1984 to 1989 he studied in Russia at the Kaliningrad Higher Naval College. From 1994 to 1997 he studied at the Frunze Military Academy of the Russian Armed Forces, graduating with a gold medal. In 2006 he took an English-language military course at the University of York in the United Kingdom, and in 2008 took a course at the Military Academy of the Russian Armed Forces. In 2011, he attended courses at Harvard Kennedy School.

He served in the Armed Forces of Armenia from 1993 to 2018. He previously served as the head of the intelligence department of the General Staff of the Armed Forces, but was dismissed from this post in 2016 due to shortcomings in the armed forces' intelligence in the 2016 Nagorno-Karabakh conflict. He holds the rank of major general. From 2018 to 2021 he was an advisor to Prime Minister Nikol Pashinyan. From 13 April to 20 July 2021 he was the First Deputy Chief of the General Staff of the Armed Forces of Armenia. On 20 July 2021, by the decision of Prime Minister Nikol Pashinyan, he was appointed First Deputy Minister of Defense, and on 2 August of the same year, he was appointed Minister of Defense.

Karapetyan was dismissed on 15 November 2021 and succeeded by Suren Papikyan.

References 

1967 births
Living people
Armenian military personnel
Defence ministers of Armenia
Armenian generals